Peter Victor Öhman (born April 7, 1992) is a Swedish professional ice hockey player currently with Västerviks IK of the HockeyAllsvenskan. He formerly a left winger for Malmö Redhawks in HockeyAllsvenskan and J20 SuperElit.

Ohman joined Herning from Linköpings HC of the Swedish Hockey League on June 6, 2014, after he was initially loaned to rival Danish club, Aalborg Pirates for the previous season.

References

External links
 

1992 births
Living people
Aalborg Pirates players
Herning Blue Fox players
Kristianstads IK players
Malmö Redhawks players
IK Oskarshamn players
IF Sundsvall Hockey players
Västerviks IK players
Swedish ice hockey left wingers
Sportspeople from Malmö